Gallo Matese is a comune (municipality) in the Province of Caserta in the Italian region Campania, located in a valley near the Matese Apennines chain and the boundary with Molise, about  north of Naples and about  north of Caserta. Its territory is also home of an artificial lake with the same name. The territory is mostly mountainous.

The town was one of the few settled by a small Bulgar horde in the 7th century.

References

External links
Official website

Cities and towns in Campania